Yevgeni Kuznetsov may refer to:
 Yevgeni Kuznetsov (footballer, born 1961), Soviet Olympic champion footballer
 Yevgeni Kuznetsov (footballer, born 1983), Russian footballer
 Yevgeni Kuznetsov (footballer, born 2000), Russian footballer
 Evgeny Kuznetsov (born 1992), Russian ice hockey player
 Yevgeni Kuznetsov (mechanic), Russian pioneer of polar aviation
 Yevgeni Kuznetsov (actor) (1916-1973), Soviet actor
 Yevgeny Semyonovich Kuznetsov (1938–2005), Russian politician, former head of Stavropol Krai
 Yevgeniy Kuznetsov, Kazakhstani bowler who participated in the 2006 Asian Games
 Evgeny Kuznetsov (diver) (born 1990), Russian diver